A number of musical CDs have been created for the media franchise built around Tadatoshi Fujimaki's manga Kuroko's Basketball. Various theme songs and character songs were released on singles. One extended play and three soundtrack have also been released.

The anime television series consists of seven opening themes and seven ending themes.

EPs

Singles

Soundtrack

References

External links
 Kuroko's Basketball Lantis discography page 

Book soundtracks
Discographies of Japanese artists
Anime soundtracks
D